Kent was a provincial electoral district for the Legislative Assembly of New Brunswick, Canada.  It used a bloc voting system to elect candidates.  It was abolished with the 1973 electoral redistribution, when the province moved to single-member ridings.

Members of the Legislative Assembly

Election results

References

Former provincial electoral districts of New Brunswick
1974 disestablishments in New Brunswick